Franz-Walter Woidich (2 January 1921 – 5 July 2004) was a Luftwaffe flying ace of World War II. Wernitz was credited with 110 aerial victories claimed in roughly 1000 combat missions. He was also a recipient of the Knight's Cross of the Iron Cross, the highest award in the military and paramilitary forces of Nazi Germany during World War II.

Career
Woidich was born on 2 January 1921 in Znojmo, present-day Czech Republic, at the time in the bilingual region of southern Moravia of the First Czechoslovak Republic. Oberfähnrich (Ensign) Woidich joined the 5. Staffel (5th Squadron) of Jagdgeschwader 27 (JG 27–27th Fighter Wing) on 11 July 1941, then stationed in North Africa. He was credited with two aerial victories out of four claims filed in the North African theater of operations. The first claim was made on 22 November 1941 over a Royal Australian Air Force Curtiss P-40 during the Siege of Tobruk. On 12 February 1942, Woidich engaged in combat with Curtiss P-40 Kittyhawk fighters from No. 73 and No. 274 Squadron from the Royal Air Force (RAF) in the vicinity of Tobruk on a Junkers Ju 87 dive-bomber escort mission. On 15 March 1942, Woidich claimed a Curtiss P-40 Kittyhawk shot down in combat with No. 450 Squadron RAAF, No. 260 Squadron RAF and 2 Squadron SAAF.

Eastern Front
He was transferred to the 3. Staffel of Jagdgeschwader 52 (JG 52–52nd Fighter Wing) which fought on the Eastern Front on 1 April 1942. Here he claimed seven aerial victories by the end of 1942. On 11 June 1943, Woidich succeeded Oberleutnant Rudolf Miethig who was killed in action the day before as Staffelkapitän (squadron leader) of 3. Staffel of JG 52. At the time his score had increased to 16 aerial victories. On 13 July 1943 during the Battle of Kursk, Woidich, accompanied by his wingman Leutnant Franz Schall, claimed two Ilyushin Il-2 ground attack aircraft shot down.

His score of enemy aircraft shot down had increased to 56 by the end of 1943. He had claimed four aircraft shot down on both 7 and 13 July 1943. He was decorated with the Knight's Cross of the Iron Cross on 11 June 1944 following his 80th aerial victory. A noteworthy achievement was made on 11 January 1944 when he claimed his 57th to 60th aerial victory. He became an "ace-in-a-day" on 17 January 1944 when he shot down his 62nd to 66th enemy aircraft. He again claimed four aircraft shot down on 16 April 1944 for victories 72 to 75. His most successful month was July 1944 with 29 aircraft shot down. In July 1944, Woidich was credited with his 100th aerial victory. He was the 84th Luftwaffe pilot to achieve the century mark. On 10 August, he transferred command of 3. Staffel to Leutnant Leonhard Färber.

Woidich was transferred to Ergänzungsstaffel (Training/Supplement Squadron) of Jagdgeschwader 400 (JG 400–400th Fighter Wing) for conversion training to the Messerschmitt Me 163 rocket powered aircraft on 11 August 1944. As a Staffelkapitän (squadron leader) of the 6./JG 400 he claimed one of the very rare aerial victories while flying the Me 163 rocket fighter on 22 April 1945.

After World War II in 1953, Ing.-grad. Woidich together with Dipl.-Ing. Karl Thress opened the Ingenieurbüro Woidich (Engineering Office Woidich), an automotive technical engineering bureau, in Mainz-Kastel. Woidich's son, Dipl.-Bw. Gerd Woidich, joined the firm in 1981.

Summary of career

Aerial victory claims
According to US historian David T. Zabecki, Woidich was credited with 110 aerial victories. Spick also lists Woidich with 110 aerial victories claimed in approximately 1,000 combat missions. Mathews and Foreman, authors of Luftwaffe Aces — Biographies and Victory Claims, researched the German Federal Archives and found records for 82 aerial victory claims, plus thirty further unconfirmed claims. This figure of confirmed claims includes 78 aerial victories on the Eastern Front and three on the Western Front, including one four-engined bomber flying the Me 163 rocket fighter.

Victory claims were logged to a map-reference (PQ = Planquadrat), for example "PQ 82191". These sectors were then subdivided into 36 smaller units to give a location area 3 × 4 km in size.

Awards
 Iron Cross (1939) 2nd and 1st Class
 Honour Goblet of the Luftwaffe on 13 September 1943 as Oberfeldwebel and pilot
 German Cross in Gold on 17 October 1943 as Oberfeldwebel in the 3./Jagdgeschwader 52
 Knight's Cross of the Iron Cross on 11 June 1944 as pilot and Leutnant of the Reserves in the 3./Jagdgeschwader 52

Notes

References

Citations

Bibliography

 
 
 
 
 
 
 
 
 
 
 
 
 
 
 
 
 

1921 births
2004 deaths
People from Znojmo
Luftwaffe pilots
German World War II flying aces
Recipients of the Gold German Cross
Recipients of the Knight's Cross of the Iron Cross
Moravian-German people
Naturalized citizens of Germany